The Peugeot Type 10 was a 5-seater closed-top car (body style similar to that of an estate car) produced from 1894 to 1896 by Peugeot. The engine was a V-twin that displaced 1645 cc. Three units were made.

References
Histomobile, Peugeot Type 10
Peugeot Car Models from 1889 to 1909

Type 10
1890s cars
Vehicles introduced in 1894
Rear-engined vehicles